Monalisa Baruah Mehta (Maiden Name: Monalisa Baruah ) is a table tennis player of Assam. She received an Arjuna Award in 1987 and is an important Assamese sports personality.

She is married to Kamlesh Mehta, eight-time national table tennis champion.

She has recently purchased an apartment in Shine Heaven, Panjabari, Guwahati.
She is employed in Oil India Limited.

References

Indian female table tennis players
Recipients of the Arjuna Award
Living people
Sportswomen from Assam
20th-century Indian women
20th-century Indian people
Racket sportspeople from Assam
Year of birth missing (living people)